Ingrid Mickler-Becker (née Becker on 26 September 1942) is a former West German athlete. Her name is sometimes written incorrectly as Ingrid Mickler in result lists. Her international career lasted from 1960 to 1972. She won the pentathlon gold medal at the 1968 Summer Olympics and the 4×100 m relay gold medal at the 1972 Summer Olympics. Becker was the first German woman to clear 1.70 m in high jump (1970) and 6.50 m in the long jump (1967).

At the 1969 European Athletics Championships she won a silver medal as a member of the 4×100 metre relay team. In 1970 she won the European Cup Final in 100 metres, defeating the favourite Renate Stecher (GDR). Next year she won two European titles, in the long jump and 4×100 m relay, and placed second in the 100 meters.

Becker was elected German Sportswoman of the Year in 1968 and 1971, and received the Silbernes Lorbeerblatt (Silver Bay Leaf) in 1968. In 1969 she was awarded the Rudolf Harbig Memorial Award, and then for many years worked for the German Sports Federation. In 1982–84 and 1986–90 she was vice president of the Federal Panel of Women Sports of the German Athletics Association.

In 1990 she became secretary of state in Rhineland-Palatinate, but lost this position when her party, the CDU, lost the election in 1991. Afterwards she worked for a German-Swiss consultancy company. In 2005, she was awarded the "Goldene Sportpyramide" (Golden Sport Pyramid) from the Deutsche Sporthilfe (German Sports Aid), and in 2006 she was inducted into the Germany's Sports Hall of Fame. She is a member of the German National Olympic Committee.

References

External links
 

1942 births
Living people
People from Geseke
Sportspeople from Arnsberg (region)
West German pentathletes
West German female sprinters
West German female high jumpers
West German female long jumpers
Olympic athletes of the United Team of Germany
Olympic athletes of West Germany
Olympic gold medalists for West Germany
Olympic gold medalists in athletics (track and field)
Athletes (track and field) at the 1960 Summer Olympics
Athletes (track and field) at the 1964 Summer Olympics
Athletes (track and field) at the 1968 Summer Olympics
Athletes (track and field) at the 1972 Summer Olympics
Medalists at the 1968 Summer Olympics
Medalists at the 1972 Summer Olympics
European Athletics Championships medalists